Liverpool Wavertree is a borough constituency of the Parliament of the United Kingdom. It was created in 1997 and every election since has been won by a Labour Party candidate.

An earlier constituency of the same name existed between 1918 and 1983, but lay further to the south-east, and was a predominantly Conservative seat.

Boundaries

1918–1950: The County Borough of Liverpool wards of Allerton, Childwall and Little Woolton, Garston, Much Woolton, Wavertree, and Wavertree West.

1950–1983: The County Borough of Liverpool wards of Broadgreen, Childwall, Church, and Old Swan.

1997–2010: The City of Liverpool wards of Broadgreen, Childwall, Church, Kensington, Old Swan, and Picton.

2010–present: The City of Liverpool wards of Childwall, Church, Kensington and Fairfield, Old Swan, Picton, and Wavertree.

The constituency is one of five covering the city of Liverpool, and covers the localities in the eastern parts of the city such as Wavertree, Broadgreen, Childwall, Edge Hill, Kensington, Fairfield, part of Mossley Hill and Old Swan.

History
The present Liverpool Wavertree constituency dates from 1997. It contained parts of the former constituencies of Liverpool Broadgreen and Liverpool Mossley Hill. It was held by Jane Kennedy of the Labour Party from 1997 to 2010, who was also the former MP for Liverpool Broadgreen. At  the 2005 general election, the Labour lead over the Liberal Democrats was cut from 38 points to 15 points.  At the 2010 general election, Jane Kennedy retired, and Luciana Berger was selected as the official Labour candidate, which caused some friction in the local CLP, especially due to her close connection with Kennedy.

An earlier Liverpool Wavertree constituency existed until 1983; this was further to the south-east in the city and was predominantly a Conservative seat, occasionally with large majorities. It had been created in 1918, but a declining population in the 1970s caused it to be split between Liverpool Garston, the newly formed Liverpool Broadgreen and Liverpool Mossley Hill constituencies. While the Conservatives have fared badly in the new Wavertree constituency (polling under 7% at the 2005 general election), a direct comparison must take into account the differing boundaries since the 1997 recreation: with more inner-city areas than its previous incarnation, the seat is home to constituents on a lower income than the average in the North West and who are traditionally less sympathetic to Conservative policies. The 2015 general election result made the seat the seventh-safest of Labour's 232 seats by percentage of majority.

At the 2010 general election, the Liberal Democrats' targeting of the seat led to a high turnout; however, it was comfortably retained by Labour with a 2.1% swing away from the Liberal Democrats. The unexpected turnout led, unusually, to one polling station running out of ballot papers.

Members of Parliament

Elections

Elections in the 2010s

Elections in the 2000s

Elections in the 1990s

Elections in the 1970s

Elections in the 1960s

Elections in the 1950s

Elections in the 1940s

A general election was planned for 1939–1940 but was postponed because of war. By the end of 1939, the following candidates had been selected; 
 Conservative: Peter Stapleton Shaw 
 Labour: Clifford Kenyon 
 Liberal: Nelia Muspratt

Elections in the 1930s

Elections in the 1920s

Elections in the 1910s

See also
 List of parliamentary constituencies in Merseyside

References

Parliamentary constituencies in North West England
Wavetree
Constituencies of the Parliament of the United Kingdom established in 1918
Constituencies of the Parliament of the United Kingdom disestablished in 1983
Constituencies of the Parliament of the United Kingdom established in 1997